Ancillary Justice is a science fiction novel by the American writer Ann Leckie, published in 2013. It is Leckie's debut novel and the first in her Imperial Radch space opera trilogy, followed by Ancillary Sword (2014) and Ancillary Mercy (2015). The novel follows Breq—who is both the sole survivor of a starship destroyed by treachery and the vessel of that ship's artificial consciousness—as she seeks revenge against the ruler of her civilization. The cover art is by John Harris.

Ancillary Justice received critical praise and won the Hugo Award, Nebula Award, BSFA Award, Arthur C. Clarke Award, and Locus Award for Best First Novel. It is the only novel to have won the Hugo, Nebula, and Arthur C. Clarke awards.

Another novel, Provenance (2017), and two short stories, "Night's Slow Poison" and "She Commands Me and I Obey", are set in the same fictional universe.

Setting and synopsis
Ancillary Justice is a space opera set thousands of years in the future, where the principal power in human space is the expansionist Radch empire. The empire uses space ships controlled by AIs, who control human bodies ("ancillaries") to use as soldiers. The Radchaai do not distinguish people by gender, which Leckie conveys by using "she" pronouns for everybody, and by having the Radchaai main character guess, frequently incorrectly, when she has to use languages with gender-specific pronouns.

The narrative begins nearly twenty years after the disappearance of a Radch starship, the Justice of Toren, when the sole surviving ancillary (and a fragment of the Justice of Torens consciousness), Breq, encounters an officer, Seivarden, who had been a lieutenant on the Justice of Toren 1,000 years earlier. The two are on an ice planet, and Seivarden is in precarious condition. The plot switches between two strands: Breq's "present-day" quest for justice for the Justice of Torens destruction and flashbacks from 19 years earlier when the Justice of Toren was in orbit around the planet of Shis'urna, which was being formally brought into the Radchaai empire. The reader eventually finds out that the Justice of Torens destruction was the result of a covert war between two opposed strands of consciousness of the Lord of the Radch, Anaander Mianaai, who uses multiple synchronized bodies to rule her far-flung empire.  At the end of the novel, Breq associates herself with the more pacific aspect of Anaander Mianaai while waiting for an opportunity to exact her revenge.

Critical reception
The novel received widespread acclaim and recognition, but also some criticism. Russell Letson's Locus review appreciated the ambitious structure of Leckie's novel, which interweaves several past and present strands of action in a manner reminiscent of Iain M. Banks's Use of Weapons, and its engagement with the tropes of recent space opera as established by Banks, Ursula K. Le Guin, C. J. Cherryh and others. He concluded that "[t]his is not entry-level SF, and its payoff is correspondingly greater because of that."

In the opinion of Genevieve Valentine, writing for NPR, the "assured, gripping and stylish" novel succeeded both on the large and on the small scale, as the tale of an empire and as a character study. Tor.com's Liz Bourke  praised Leckie's worldbuilding and her writing as "clear and muscular, with a strong forward impetus, like the best of thriller writing", concluding that Ancillary Justice was "both an immensely fun novel, and a conceptually ambitious one".

Nina Allan's review in Arc was more critical: while she found "nothing lazy, cynical or even particularly commercial-minded" in the novel, she criticized its characterization and considered that its uncritical adoption of space opera tropes and the "disappointingly simple" ideas it conveyed (such as that empires are evil) made Ancillary Justice "an SF novel of the old school: tireless in its recapitulation of genre norms and more or less impenetrable to outsiders".

Awards
Ancillary Justice won the following awards:
 Arthur C. Clarke Award for best science fiction novel of the year, 2014
 British Science Fiction Association BSFA Award for Best Novel
 Hugo Award for Best Novel from the World Science Fiction Society (WSFS), 2014
 Kitschies Golden Tentacle for best debut novel, 2013.
 Locus Award for Best First Novel, 2014
 Nebula Award for Best Novel from the  Science Fiction and Fantasy Writers of America, 2013
Seiun Award for Best Translated Novel, 2016.

The novel was also nominated for the following awards:
 Finalist for the Compton Crook Award for best first science fiction/fantasy/horror novel from the Baltimore Science Fiction Society.
 Named to the James Tiptree Jr. Award Honor List, for science fiction or fantasy that expands or explores our understanding of gender.
 Shortlisted for the Philip K. Dick Award for distinguished original science fiction paperback.

Television adaptation
The novel was optioned for television in October 2014 by the production company Fabrik and Fox Television Studios. Leckie wrote that the producers responded positively to her concerns about how the ungendered, dark-skinned Radchaai characters could be presented in a visual medium.

References

Relevant literature 
de Vogel, M. E. "Serious Shenanigans The New Space Opera and Social Commentary: An Analysis of Iain M. Banks's Surface Detail and The Hydrogen Sonata and Ann Leckie's Imperial Radch Trilogy." Utrecht University: Master's thesis, 2018.
Gibson, Rebecca. In Gibson, Rebecca. “Blood Stays Inside Your Arteries, Dlique”: Aliens, Cyborgs, Death, and Tea Ceremonies in Ann Leckie's Imperial Radch Trilogy. Global Perspectives on the Liminality of the Supernatural, Edited by Rebecca Gibson And James M. Vanderveen. Rowman and Littlefield.
Töyrylä, Roosa. "“I Might As Well Be Human. But I’m Not.”: Focalization and Narration in Ann Leckie’s Imperial Radch Trilogy." (2020).
Wright, Wendy L. 2022. Ann Leckie's Ancillary Trilogy and the revolutionary potential of care. In ContactZone : Rivista dell'Associazione Italiana per lo Studio della fantascienza e del Fantastico, ed. by Paolo Loffredo. 1,57-69.

External links
 Ancillary Justice on Ann Leckie's website

American science fiction novels
Space opera novels
2013 American novels
2013 science fiction novels
Novels about artificial intelligence
Hugo Award for Best Novel-winning works
Nebula Award for Best Novel-winning works
Debut science fiction novels
Literature by women
Novels set on fictional planets
2013 debut novels
Novels by Ann Leckie
First-person narrative novels
Orbit Books books